Neuenbürg is a town in the Enz district, in Baden-Württemberg, Germany. It is situated on the river Enz, 10 km southwest of Pforzheim.

History
Between 1315 and 1322, Neuenbürg became a possession of the Counts of Württemberg, who gave it town rights. The Oberamt was dissolved on 1 October 1938 and its constituents were assigned to the Calw district. Arnbach, Dennach, and Waldrennach were fully incorporated into Neuenbürg on 1 January 1975.

Geography
The geological makeup of the municipal area is decided by the meeting of the Pfinzhügelland's muschelkalk and keuper and the Black Forest's buntsandstein plateaus. Where the Enz flows into Birkenfeld marks the lowest elevation above sea level in the municipal area,  Normalnull (NN). The highest is the top of the Heuberg, south of Dennach, at  NN.

A portion of the  Federally-protected nature reserve is found within Neuenbürg's municipal area.

Coat of arms
Neuenbürg's municipal coat of arms depicts a red, hexagonal tower upon a field of white. The oldest images to be associated with the township are from 1440, as an engraving, and in 1490, from a print. The first coat of arms associated with Neuenbürg is from 1535, and showed the tower in red but the field as being blue. This pattern was then approved by the Federal Ministry of the Interior on 18 February 1958.

Transport
The town has three stops, Neuenbürg, Neuenbürg Süd and Neuenbürg Freibad, on route S6 of the Karlsruhe Stadtbahn, which operates over the Enztalbahn railway.

References

Enzkreis
Württemberg